Meckel may refer to:

People

German anatomist/physician family Meckel 
 Johann Friedrich Meckel, the Younger (1781–1833), German anatomist
 Johann Friedrich Meckel, the Elder (1724–1774) German anatomist, grandfather of the Younger
 Philipp Friedrich Theodor Meckel (1755–1803) German anatomist, father of Johann Friedrich the Younger
 August Albrecht Meckel (1789–1829) German physician. brother of Johann Friedrich the Younger
 Johann Heinrich Meckel (1821–1856) German anatomist, son of Johann Friedrich the Younger

Others 
 Christoph Meckel (1935–2020) German author and graphic artist
 Jakob Meckel (1842–1905) Prussian general
 Markus Meckel (born 1952) German theologian and politician
 Miriam Meckel (born 1967) German journalist and academic

Places 
  Meckel, Germany

See also 
 

German-language surnames